Histiogamphelus cristatus, known as Macleay's crested pipefish or rhino pipefish, is a species of marine fish belonging to the family Sygnathidae. This species can be found in a variety of marine habitats such as seagrass beds, sandy ocean bottoms, and estuaries, surrounding south and southwestern Australia. Their main source of food are small crustaceans found in the water column or in sediments. Males of the species brood eggs and give birth to live offspring.

References

External links 
 H. cristatus at Fishbase
 H. cristatus at Fishes of Australia
 H. cristatus at Australian Museum

Syngnathidae
Fish described in 1881